Marco Jansen (born 1 May 2000) is a South African cricketer who plays for the South Africa national cricket team and Warriors in domestic matches.

Early life
During his early years, Jansen used to open the batting. At the age of nine, in a 20-over match, he scored 164 not out. His father watched the match and identified his son's talent. He trained Jansen in the nets along with his twin brother Duan. Duan also plays cricket for North West.

Domestic and T20 franchise career
Jansen made his List A debut for North West in the 2017–18 CSA Provincial One-Day Challenge on 8 April 2018. He made his first-class debut for North West in the 2018–19 CSA 3-Day Provincial Cup on 11 October 2018.

In January 2019, Jansen was named in the South Africa national under-19 cricket team's squad, ahead of their tour to India. He was the leading wicket-taker for North West in the 2018–19 CSA 3-Day Provincial Cup, with 27 dismissals in six matches.

Jansen made his Twenty20 debut for Knights in the 2018–19 CSA T20 Challenge on 28 April 2019. He was the leading wicket-taker for North West in the 2018–19 CSA 3-Day Provincial Cup, with 27 dismissals in six matches.

In September 2019, Jansen was named in the squad for the Durban Heat team for the 2019 Mzansi Super League tournament.

In February 2021, Jansen was bought by the Mumbai Indians in the IPL auction ahead of the 2021 Indian Premier League. Jansen made his IPL debut for Mumbai Indians against Royal Challengers Bangalore on 9 April 2021. He took 2 wickets for 28 runs in his 4 overs, which included the wicket of Glenn Maxwell, his debut IPL wicket. Later the same month, he was named in Eastern Province's squad, ahead of the 2021–22 cricket season in South Africa.

In February 2022, Jansen was bought by the Sunrisers Hyderabad in the auction for the 2022 Indian Premier League tournament.

International career

In January 2021, Jansen was added to South Africa's Test squad for their series against Pakistan. 

In May 2021, Jansen was named in South Africa's Test squad for their series against the West Indies. In December 2021, Jansen received another call-up to South Africa's Test squad, this time for their home series against India. He made his Test debut on 26 December 2021, against India. His maiden test wicket was Jasprit Bumrah, caught at third slip by Wiaan Mulder.

In January 2022, Jansen got his maiden One Day International (ODI) call-up, for South Africa's home series against India. He made his ODI debut on 19 January 2022, for South Africa against India. In May 2022, Jansen was named in South Africa's Twenty20 International (T20I) squad for their away series against India. He made his T20I debut on 17 June 2022, for South Africa against India.

References

External links
 

2000 births
Living people
South African cricketers
South Africa Test cricketers
South Africa One Day International cricketers
South Africa Twenty20 International cricketers
Mumbai Indians cricketers
North West cricketers
Warriors cricketers
People from Klerksdorp
Durban Heat cricketers
Sunrisers Hyderabad cricketers